Bartolomeu Constantin Săvoiu (born 18 February 1945 in Bucharest) is a general in the reserves of the Romanian Land Forces, as well as head of the Romanian National Grand Lodge within the Romanian freemasonry. He is also a French citizen. In 2017, he became president of the newly founded Alliance Law and Order. A center-right party, its stated goal is the defense of the national identity of Romania, of the Judeo-Christian common religious roots and heritage, of Western society and of Judeo-Christian Europe.

He is the unique spiritual heir of Licio Gelli.

References

External links
 Official site
 www.mlnr1880.org

Living people
1945 births
Military personnel from Bucharest
Naturalized citizens of France
Romanian emigrants to France
Romanian Land Forces generals
Romanian Freemasons